Rivoningo Mhlari (born 28 July 1994) is a South African businessman and co-founder of Rikatec (Pty) Limited.

The company creates an information management system for vehicles that provides real-time predictive maintenance for fleets, monitors driving habits, wear and tear and break detection and diagnosis.

Following the company's success, Rivoningo was listed among Forbes Africa's 30 Under 30, a list of 30 young entrepreneurs within the technology and digitization sphere that have proven to have innovative businesses that shape their societies in Africa.

In June 2018, Rivoningo was again listed as one of the 10 Young African Technology Entrepreneurs and as one of the 200 Young South Africans (Business and Entrepreneurship) in the Mail and Guardian published on 29 June 2018.

References

External links
 Forbes Under 30 Technology in Forbes Africa of June 2018.
 10 young African tech entrepreneurs to look out for in IT News Africa of 2 July 2018. 
 A celebration of SA's young trailblazers in Sowetan Live of 21 June 2018.

1995 births
Living people
South African businesspeople
University of Cape Town alumni